Taxi zum Klo is a 1981 film written by, directed by, and starring Frank Ripploh.  The film is a dark comedy of manners that explores the life of a Berlin school teacher and the contrasts between his public and private lives. It was sexually explicit for general audiences of the day and for some time afterwards. As a result, the film was not passed uncut by the British Board of Film Classification until 2011, though it was widely shown in club cinemas. Taxi zum Klo was considered groundbreaking for its subject matter and achieved a cult status among audiences of the time.

Shot on location with many characters appearing as themselves, the film documents gay culture in West Berlin in the brief moment post gay liberation and before the onset of AIDS, around 1980.  Ripploh has stated that much of the film was autobiographical. The name literally means Taxi to the Toilet (or "Cab to the Cottage", etc.), that being a place for casual gay sex.

Cast
 Frank Ripploh as Frank Ripploh
 Bernd Broaderup as Bernd
 Orpha Termin
 Peter Fahrni as Gas station attendant
 Hans-Gerd Mehrtens as the Leather Boy
 Dieter Godde
 Klaus Schnee
 Bernd Kroger
 Markus Voigtlander
 Irmgard Lademacher
 Gregor Becker
 Marguerite Dupont
 Eberhard Freudenthal
 Beate Springer
 Millie Büttner
 Gitta Lederer
 Toller Cranston in a cameo role as himself

Critical reception
The Village Voice hailed it as "the first masterpiece about the mainstream of male gay life". Taxi zum Klo tied with Beau-père in winning the 1981 Boston Society of Film Critics Award for best foreign language film.

References

External links

1981 films
Documentary films about Berlin
West German films
1980s German-language films
German LGBT-related films
Documentary films about LGBT topics
1981 LGBT-related films
1980s German films